The first elections to the new Manchester City Council were held on Thursday, 10 May 1973.  The election created the entire 99-member council (three councillors to each ward), which shadowed its predecessor corporation before taking over its functions on 1 April 1974, as specified in the Local Government Act 1972. Each 1st-placed candidate was appointed to a five-year term of office, expiring in 1978. Each 2nd-placed candidate had a three-year term of office, expiring in 1976. Each 3rd-placed candidate served a two-year term of office, expiring in 1975.

The Labour Party gained overall control of the council.

Election result

After the election, the composition of the council was as follows:

Ward results
Detailed below are the results for each ward. Successful candidates are highlighted in bold.

Alexandra

Ardwick

Baguley

Barlow Moor

Beswick

Blackley

Bradford

Brooklands

Burnage

Charlestown

Cheetham

Chorlton

Collegiate Church

Crossacres

Crumpsall

Didsbury

Gorton North

Gorton South

Harpurhey

Hulme

Levenshulme

Lightbowne

Lloyd Street

Longsight

Miles Platting

Moss Side

Moston

Newton Heath

Northenden

Old Moat

Rusholme

Withington

Woodhouse Park

By-elections between 1973 and 1975

References

1973 English local elections
1973
1970s in Greater Manchester
1970s in Manchester